Mabie is a census-designated place in Plumas County, California, USA. The 2010 United States census reported Mabie's population was 161.

Geography
According to the United States Census Bureau, the CDP covers an area of 3.6 square miles (9.4 km2), all of it land.

Demographics
The 2010 United States Census reported that Mabie had a population of 161. The racial makeup of Mabie was 150 (93.2%) White, 0 (0.0%) African American, 0 (0.0%) Native American, 1 (0.6%) Asian, 0 (0.0%) Pacific Islander, 4 (2.5%) from other races, and 6 (3.7%) from two or more races. Hispanic or Latino of any race were 4 persons (2.5%).

The census reported that 161 people (100% of the population) lived in households, 0 (0%) lived in non-institutionalized group quarters, and 0 (0%) were institutionalized.

There were 78 households, of which 10 (12.8%) had children under the age of 18 living in them, 56 (71.8%) were opposite-sex married couples living together, 0 (0%) had a female householder with no husband present, 2 (2.6%) had a male householder with no wife present. There were 3 (3.8%) unmarried opposite-sex partnerships, and 0 (0%) same-sex married couples or partnerships. 14 households (17.9%) were made up of individuals, and 7 (9.0%) had someone living alone who was 65 years of age or older. The average household size was 2.06. There were 58 families (74.4% of all households); the average family size was 2.24.

12 people (7.5%) were under the age of 18, 8 people (5.0%) aged 18 to 24, 11 people (6.8%) aged 25 to 44, 89 people (55.3%) aged 45 to 64, and 41 people (25.5%) who were 65 years of age or older. The median age was 57.9 years. For every 100 females, there were 126.8 males. For every 100 females age 18 and over, there were 119.1 males.

The homeowner vacancy rate was 2.6%; the rental vacancy rate was 25.0%. 155 people (96.3% of the population) lived in owner-occupied housing units and 6 people (3.7%) lived in rental housing units.

Politics

References

Census-designated places in Plumas County, California
Populated places in the Sierra Nevada (United States)